George Charles Oliver (January 18, 1883 – August 20, 1965) was an American golfer who competed in the 1904 Summer Olympics. In 1904 he was part of the American team which won the bronze medal. He finished 30th in this competition. In the individual competition he finished 50th in the qualification and did not advance to the match play.

References

External links
 George Oliver's profile at databaseOlympics
 

American male golfers
Amateur golfers
Golfers at the 1904 Summer Olympics
Olympic bronze medalists for the United States in golf
Medalists at the 1904 Summer Olympics
1883 births
1965 deaths